The Bedick, or Bedik, are a minority ethnic group of Africa. They live in villages in the most isolated area of eastern Senegal, in the Arrondissement of Bandafassi.  is one of their settlements.  

The Bedick speak the Bedik language  and their religion is a blend between their animist roots and a more recent Christian influence. More connected with Guinea Conakry or Mali than with Senegal, Bedick people have contact with other ethnic groups like Bassari and Serer. Their ancestors are the families Keita and Camera that came from Mali because of the War led by Alpha Yaye coming from Fouta Djalon.

Gallery

References

Ethnic groups in Senegal